Europe XI v Africa XI (1997) was a friendly football match that took place on 29 January 1997 at the Estádio da Luz in Lisbon, Portugal, between a European select side and an African select side. The match was jointly organized by UEFA and CAF as part of the European Year against Racism. The African XI won 2–1 with goals from Abedi Pele and Mustapha Hadji.

Background
The European Union's "Year Against Racism" started with an exhibition match between All-Star teams representing Europe and Africa. The following day, UEFA, European football's ruling body, and CAF, its African counterpart, held their first joint-executive meeting in Lisbon where they signed a friendship agreement which ended years of barely concealed hostility. The agreement obliged the two confederations to "undertake extensive co-operation in all football-related matters as partners with equal rights".

The European side, selected by Rinus Michels and Berti Vogts, had a 17-man squad which contained four players who were among Germany's Euro 96 winners, including their captain, Jürgen Klinsmann, as well as the Dutch twin brothers Ronald and Frank de Boer, and Zvonimir Boban, Milan's Croat midfielder. While many of the world's top players were involved, there were no English players in the European squad as the Premier League had a packed schedule that night. No players from eastern European clubs were involved either, because of their winter break. The African All-Stars 18-man squad, selected by Rabah Madjer and Mawade Wade, included four of Nigeria's Olympic gold-medal winning squad and two of South Africa's African championship winning squad.

Selecting Benfica's Stadium of Light to host the event was a deliberate choice serving to recognise the enormous contribution that Benfica's greatest player, Eusébio, had made to European football. Benfica had players in both squads, with Portugal's João Pinto in the European camp and Paulo António of Angola, in the African. Because the intention was to give everybody a game, both teams were allowed to use two re-substitutions - the sending back on a player previously substituted - in the event of second-half injuries. As a continuing part of the anti-racism initiative, the under-17 Meridian Cup, which comprises four nations from each continent, kicked off two days later.

Match

References

External links
 

1997 in African football
Africa
1997 in Portuguese sport